Dazhou–Chengdu Railway or Dacheng Railway, is a double-track, electrified railroad in Sichuan Province of southwest China. The railway is named after its two terminal cities Chengdu and Dazhou. Other cities  and towns along the route include Suining and Nanchong. The line is owned and operated by the Dacheng Railway Company Limited, a 70-30 joint venture between the Ministry of Railways and Sichuan Provincial Government.

Route
The Dacheng-Chengdu Railway runs from Chengdu, the provincial capital in central Sichuan to Sanhui Township of Qu County, Dazhou Municipality in eastern Sichuan.  The Dacheng Line forms an important link in China's national railway network, connecting the Baoji-Chengdu and Chengdu-Kunming Railways in the west with the Suining−Chongqing Railway in the center and Xiangyang-Chongqing Railway in the east.  It is a major railway outlet for the Sichuan Basin, and a section of the Shanghai–Wuhan–Chengdu High-Speed Railway.  High-speed train service between Chengdu and Chongqing run on the Dazhou−Chengdu and Suining−Chongqing Lines instead of the longer and older Chengdu–Chongqing Railway.

History
The Dacheng Railway was proposed in 1958 by Railway Minister Teng Daiyuan but was halted after two years of planning due to economic difficulties caused by the Great Leap Forward.  The project was reconsidered in 1965 but was set aside in favor of building the Xiangfan-Chongqing Railway first. In 1986, Deng Xiaoping, a native of eastern Sichuan, pressed for the project to proceed and construction began in June 1992.  Some  of new tracks were laid.  The railway opened on December 25, 1997.

From June 2005 to 1 July 2009, the entire line was electrified. A second track was opened on the Chengdu–Suining section on 1 April 2006 that allows trains to reach a top speed of 200 km/h. A second line was added to the Suining-Sanhui section in the east and trains can reach 160 km/h on this section. 

On 7 July 2009, the high-speed track between Chengdu and Suining was duplicated and these two tracks were subsequently designated as the Suining–Chengdu railway. The original low-speed, single track line between Chengdu and Suining remains as part of the Dazhou–Chengdu railway.

Rail junctions
 Chengdu: Baoji–Chengdu Railway, Chengdu–Kunming Railway
 Suining: Suining–Chongqing Railway
 Dazhou: Xiangyang–Chongqing Railway

See also

 List of railways in China

References

Rail transport in Sichuan
Railway lines opened in 1997
1997 establishments in China